Gorgin may refer to:
 Gorgin, Baft, Kerman Province
 Gorgin, Ramsar, in mazandaran Province Citizen of Gorgin Pourahmadi, lives in Ramsar
 Gorgin, Kurdistan
 Gorgin, Qazvin
 Gorgin Rural District, in Khuzestan Province
 Gorgin (Shahnameh), an Iranian hero in Shahnameh